Carmanova (Karmanove; , Karmanovo) is a commune in the Grigoriopol District of Transnistria, Moldova. It is composed of four villages: Carmanova, Cotovca (Котівка, Котовка), Fedoseevca (Федосіївка, Федосеевка) and Mocearovca (Мочарівка, Мочаровка). It is currently under the administration of the breakaway government of the Transnistrian Moldovan Republic. Carmanova was known during the 19th Century as Neidorf and was inhabited by Bessarabia Germans.

References

Communes of Transnistria
Kherson Governorate